Michael Francis Shepherdson (10 December 1930 – 13 February 2016) was a Malaysian field hockey player, association football goalkeeper, and cricketer. He participated in the 1956 Melbourne Olympics, and twice in the Asian Games, in 1958 and 1962, where the Malaysian team won a bronze medal. At the 1956 Olympics he was selected to the World Xl hockey team, the first ever Malaysian representative. Later he became a goalkeeper for Selangor FA and was captain of the national cricket team. He was known for the distinction of being the only Malaysian who captained both national hockey and cricket teams "".  In 2011, he was inducted into the Olympic Council of Malaysia's (OCM) Hall of Fame for his sporting achievements.

In cricket he was credited as an early exponent of a specific technique for facing fast bowling, which was later successfully used by Australian captain Ian Chappell in the 1975-76 home Test series, against the fearsome West Indian pace attack. Harjit Singh, President of the Johor Cricket Council described Mike Shepherdson as "the finest batsman Malaysia ever produced, a gentleman, sportsman, a great friend and the finest example of a humble and caring personality.".

Shepherdson died at the Pantai Medical Centre in Kuala Lumpur in 2016, aged 85.

References

External links
 

1930 births
2016 deaths
Malaysian people of Kristang descent
Olympic field hockey players of Malaya
Malaysian male field hockey players
Field hockey players at the 1958 Asian Games
Field hockey players at the 1956 Summer Olympics
Field hockey players at the 1962 Asian Games
Asian Games medalists in field hockey
Asian Games bronze medalists for Malaysia
Association football goalkeepers
Malaysian footballers
Selangor FA players
Medalists at the 1962 Asian Games